Abu ʾl-Ḥasan ʿAlī ibn Muḥammad ibn Khalaf al-Maʿāfirī al-Qābiṣī (935–1012) was a leading Ifrīqiyan scholar (uṣūlī) of the Mālikī school of Islamic jurisprudence (fiḳh). In 996, he succeeded his first cousin Ibn Abī Zayd as leader (shaykh) of the school in al-Qayrawān (Kairouan).

Al-Qābiṣī's father was born in the village of al-Maʿāfiriyyīn near Qabis (Gabès) and his mother was from al-Qayrawān. According to oral tradition, he was the first cousin of Ibn Abī Zayd and Muḥriz ibn Khalaf, the sons of his mother's sisters. He was blind.

In Africa al-Qābiṣī was taught by Abu ʾl-ʿAbbās al-Ibyānī, a Shāfiʿī scholar from Tunis; Darrās al-Fāsī, an Ashʿarī; and Ibn Masrūr al-Dabbāgh. Accompanied by Darrās al-Fāsī and the Andalusian al-Aṣīlī, he went on a lengthy riḥla (journey) in the east from 963 until 968. During his journey, because he was blind, his companions acted as his secretaries.

Before he took up jurisprudence, al-Qābiṣī taught qirāʾāt (recitation of the Qurʾān). As a jurist he was a traditionist with Ashʿarī leanings and partial to the writings of Ibn al-Mawwāz. He had deep knowledge of the ḥadīths. He helped spread the Ṣaḥīḥ of al-Bukhārī, a collection of ḥadīths, in northern Africa and wrote for it a riwāya, an account of its transmission. His other works include a collection of ḥadīths of the Muwaṭṭaʾ, popular in al-Andalus; a treatise on the conduct of schoolmasters, inspired by the writings of Saḥnūn; an incomplete collection of traditions of fiḳh; and numerous letters on everything from Qurʾānic exegesis, the architecture of ribāṭs, the rituals of the ḥajj, the theology of al-Ashʿarī and refuting the Bakrites (i.e., the Khārijites). In his old age, he is said to have introduced the young Ibn Sharaf to poetry.

Al-Qābiṣī's authority and reputation rose after the death of Ibn Abī Zayd (996) and Ibn Shiblūn (999) and he became the leading jurisconsult in northern Africa and al-Andalus. At the time of his death he was still teaching eighty students. His successors, who carried on his work, were Abū Bakr ibn ʿAbd al-Raḥmān and Abū Imrān al-Fāsī. The culmination of the work of these Mālikī scholars of al-Qayrawān was the triumph of the Mālikī school in Africa west of Egypt and the breach between the Mālikī Zīrids and the Shīʿa Fāṭimids.

Notes

References

935 births
1012 deaths
Blind people
Tunisian Maliki scholars
10th-century jurists
11th-century jurists